Würzburger Kickers is a German association football club playing in Würzburg, Bavaria. In pre-World War II football, the club competed briefly at the highest level in the Bezirksliga Bayern, and during the war, in the Gauliga Bayern. Post-war, it made a single appearance in professional football in the southern division of the 2. Bundesliga in 1977–78. After a long stint in amateur football, dropping as low as the seventh tier, the club began a recovery. The Kickers reached professional football again in 2014–15 after winning promotion to the 3. Liga and the following season were promoted to the 2. Bundesliga.

History

Foundation and early years
FC Würzburger Kickers was founded on 17 November 1907 by local high school students under chairman Georg Beer, soon replaced by Alfred Günzburger. The club gained promotion to the Kreisliga Bayern in 1912 and establish themselves in the league.

Founded in 1907 by high school students, the team has played for most of its history as an unknown local side, although they did manage three seasons in the Bezirksliga Bayern, from 1930 to 1933, and two single season appearances in the Gauliga Bayern (1940–41, 1942–43) one of sixteen top-flight division established in the re-organization of German football under the Third Reich.

1920s to the Second World War
Until the Second World War, Kickers continued to be the determining force in Würzburg football, with FV 04 Würzburg only being able to catch up in the late 1920s.

The club was relegated in the 1922/23 season and subsequently missed out on joining the newly formed Bezirksliga Bayern the next season. Kickers were eventually promoted back to the top division for the 1930/31 season, joining rivals FV 04, where they remained until the league was dissolved in 1933.

Kickers were not selected to join the new Gauliga Bayern and did not reach the top division again until 1940/41 where they were subsequently relegated. Towards the end of World War II, Kickers were forced into a merger with FV 04 to play together as the wartime side (Kriegspielgemeinschaft) KSG Würzburg. The unified club spent two seasons in last place in the Gauliga Bayern (Gruppe Nord). Play was interrupted as the war progressed and the team was disbanded at the end of the conflict.

Kicker's stadium at Randerackerer Straße was also completely destroyed by a bombing raid during the war.

Post-war football and rise to the 2. Bundesliga Süd

After the Second World War, TSV Würzburg joined the Kickers and the club was renamed SV Würzburger Kickers. The club became part of the Landesliga Bayern (II) and put on some strong performances through the 1950s in the Amateurliga Bayern (II-III) but never quite managed a breakthrough. During this time the club moved to the newly built Stadion am Dallenberg in 1967. The club was finally promoted in 1976/77 to the 2. Bundesliga Süd, however they were relegated back to the renamed Bayernliga the following 1977/78 season.

1980s to 2012
Kickers stayed in the Bayernliga until they were relegated in 1983 due to financial difficulties contributed to the fourth division Landesliga Bayern-Nord, which became a fifth tier league in 1994. The club remained in the lower tiers of amateur football with the exception of brief appearances in the Bayernliga in 1990/91 and 1997/98.

Two difficult seasons over 2002–2004 saw the club descend through the Bezirksoberliga Unterfranken (VI) to the Bezirksliga Unterfranken (VII). Kickers recovered and returned to the Oberliga Bayern on the strength of a 2nd place in the 2007–08 Landesliga season where the club met local rival Würzburger FV there for the first Würzburg league derby since 1998–99.

The 2008–09 season proved no success, with Kickers immediately relegated again to the Landesliga, taking until 2012 to win the league again. The team was one of two clubs in the league to apply for a licence in the new tier four Regionalliga Bayern Taking part in the promotion play-off, Kickers earned a bye in the first round and defeated BC Aichach in the second to play in the Regionalliga from 2012. The club was thereby also able to win promotion from the sixth tier to the fourth without playing in the fifth.

Promotions and successes
Since promotion in 2012 Kickers have enjoyed a period of renewed success including winning the 2013–14 Bavarian Cup on penalties in the final against SV Schalding-Heining and thereby qualified for the first round of the 2014–15 DFB-Pokal. In the league, the club finished tenth in 2013 and eleventh in 2014. In the 2014–15 DFB Pokal, Kickers knocked-out Fortuna Düsseldorf in the first round but was defeated by Eintracht Braunschweig in the second round. In the 2014–15 season, Kickers won the Regionalliga Bayern and earned the right to take part in the promotion round to the 3. Liga. They faced 1. FC Saarbrücken, runners-up of the Regionalliga Südwest, and won 1–0 away but also lost 1–0 at home. In the necessary penalty shoot-out, Kickers won 6–5 and were promoted to the 3. Liga.

In March 2016, the club's fans protested against a potential merger with local rival Würzburger FV. Kickers had been asked by the Mayor of Würzburg to hold talks about mergers and cooperation with a number of local clubs in order to receive the city's support in a stadium expansion. Kickers finished the inaugural 3. Liga season in third place, thereby qualifying for the promotion play-off and the 2016–17 DFB-Pokal. The club ensured promotion to the 2. Bundesliga for the first time in almost 40 years by winning 4–1 (2–0/2–1) on aggregate against MSV Duisburg. Despite a strong start to the season, finishing the first half in sixth place, Kickers were relegated in seventeenth place back to the 3. Liga at the end of the season.

The club won the 2018–19 Bavarian Cup following a 3–0 victory in the final over neighbours and rivals Viktoria Aschaffenburg.

In January 2020, it was announced that Felix Magath would serve as sporting director of Flyeralarm Global Soccer group, including Admira Wacker Mödling and Würzburger Kickers.

Kickers returned to the 2. Bundesliga after the 2019–20 season, finishing runners-up behind Bayern Munich II who were ineligible for promotion.

Return to Regionalliga
After promotion to the 2. Bundesliga in 2020, Würzburger Kickers were on a downward trajectory. They suffered relegation after one season in the 3. Liga in 2021, before being relegated again in the 2021–22 season – their second successive relegation – marking a return to the fourth-tier Regionalliga.

Honours

League
 3. Liga (III)
 Runners-up: 2019–20
 Third: 2015–16 (Promoted after play-off)
 Bayernliga (III)
 Champions: 1977
 Bayernliga-Nord (III)
 Runners-up: 1955, 1960
 Regionalliga Bayern (IV)
 Champions: 2014–15
 Landesliga Bayern-Nord (IV-V)
 Champions: 1990, 1997, 2012
 Runners-up: 2008
 Bezirksoberliga Unterfranken (VI)
 Champions: 2005
 Bezirksliga Unterfranken (VII)
 Champions: 2004

Cup
 Bavarian Cup
 Winners: 2014, 2016, 2019

Players

Current squad

Recent managers
Recent managers of the club:

Recent seasons
The recent season-by-season performance of the club:

With the introduction of the Bezirksoberligas in 1988 as the new fifth tier, below the Landesligas, all leagues below dropped one tier. With the introduction of the Regionalligas in 1994 and the 3. Liga in 2008 as the new third tier, below the 2. Bundesliga, all leagues below dropped one tier. With the establishment of the Regionalliga Bayern as the new fourth tier in Bavaria in 2012 the Bayernliga was split into a northern and a southern division, the number of Landesligas expanded from three to five and the Bezirksoberligas abolished. All leagues from the Bezirksligas onwards were elevated one tier.

Key

Stadium

Kickers have played in three different home grounds through their history beginning with Galgenberg, also known as Kugelfang, for two years sharing the ground with local rivals Würzburger FV (formally known as FV 04 Würzburg).

From 1909 to 1967 the club played in Sanderau at the Randersacker Straße stadium before being forced to move due to the expanding city.

Since 1967 the club have played at the Stadion am Dallenberg which currently has a capacity of 13,090 (4,000 seated). In 2013 flyeralarm acquired the naming rights to the stadium which has since been known as flyeralarm Arena. The facility was renovated in 2005 and equipped with floodlights in 2014. In preparation for the 2016/17 season in the 2. Bundesliga the stadium was expanded and under soil heating was added at a cost of €2 million.

Supporters and rivalries
The Würzburg derby is a fierce local rivalry with Würzburger FV, and the fans have a hostility with fans of 1. FC Schweinfurt 05.

Reserve team
The club's reserve team won promotion to the tier five Bayernliga for the first time after defeating VfL Frohnlach in the play-off for the 2016–17 Bayernliga.

The Würzburg derby

The Würzburg derby between Würzburger Kickers and FV Würzburg 04 was first played in 1908 with Kickers winning 5–0. The 2009–10 season was the 19th time, the two clubs played in the same league since 1963, during which time FV folded in 1981 before being reformed. The derby has only beenplayed on professional level only once, in the 1977–78 2. Bundesliga Süd season.

Results since 1963

DFB Cup appearances
The club has qualified for the first round of the German Cup ten times:

Source:

References

External links

Abseits Guide to German Soccer

 
Football clubs in Germany
Football clubs in Bavaria
Association football clubs established in 1907
Würzburg
Football in Lower Franconia
1907 establishments in Germany
2. Bundesliga clubs
3. Liga clubs